Red Arrow is a brand name given to two current and several former London bus limited stop routes used as high frequency commuter services in central London. The current Red Arrow services are routes 507 and 521, although the name was dropped from September 2009 to May 2016.

History
London Transport had instigated a Bus Reshaping Plan in 1966 to examine bus service operation, and settled on replacing some double-decker buses with long single-decker buses, which would have extra capacity by implementing a 'standee bus' model as used on the continent, whereby the fixed seating in the bus would be minimised to that required off-peak, with hand holds fitted to allow maximum standee capacity at peak times. These buses would also have dual doors.

The concept was introduced with on 18 April 1966 with six AEC Merlin buses on a new express service, route 500, running between Victoria and Marble Arch, extended during shopping hours to Oxford Circus. On 7 September 1968 LT introduced these new buses on more Red Arrow routes, 501–507, along with wholesale introduction on several other route networks around the capital.

The Red Arrow Network as of 1972 was:

500 Victoria station - Park Lane - Oxford Street - Marble Arch - Park Lane - Victoria station
501 Waterloo station - Aldwych - Holborn - St Paul's - Bank - London Bridge station
502 Waterloo station – Aldwych – Fleet Street - St Paul's – London Wall - Liverpool Street station
503 Waterloo station – Westminster Bridge - Victoria station
505 Waterloo station - Aldwych - Holborn – Old Street – Shoreditch Church
506 Victoria station – Green Park – Piccadilly Circus
507 Waterloo station – Lambeth Bridge - Victoria station
513 Waterloo station - Aldwych - Fleet Street - St Paul's – Cannon Street - London Bridge station

From February 1981, London Transport started replacing its AEC Merlin buses on the Red Arrow services with 69 new Leyland National IIs. Further expansions, contractions and renumbering of the route network occurred, but the core Red Arrow network remained into the 1980s, and into London Buses operation with the London General business unit, as part of the first stage of the privatisation of London bus services.

On 2 June 2002, the remaining two Red Arrow routes 507 and 521, became the first London Bus routes to be converted to articulated buses. A fleet of articulated Mercedes-Benz Citaro O530Gs entered service from that date. Being commuter routes, and so little used outside peak times, these routes were suitable to test the articulated on, and resembled the original standee bus concept, now with off bus fare collection. Additionally, route 521 ran through the Strand Underpass making double decker operation impossible. The artics still carried the Red Arrow name, although it was much smaller and less pronounced than all the previous versions.

As of 2008, the peak operating requirement was nine buses on the 507 and 19 on the 521. As part of the move to replace London's articulated buses, a commitment made in the 2008 London Mayoral election, the articulated buses on the 507 and 521 were replaced when their contracts expired in 2009.

The articulated Citaros were replaced by new 12 metre rigid versions. On 25 July 2009 a weekend service was introduced on route 507, the first weekend service for a Red Arrow route. Route 521 converted to rigid operation on 1 September 2009. The new Citaros did not carry the Red Arrow name, as it was thought to be associated with articulated buses. This drew criticism, as there was nothing to distinguish the buses from normal services. Another criticism of bendy buses was the low number of seats, with only 49 per vehicle. A standard rigid Citaro has 44 seats, however the new ones for route 507 and 521 had just 21, with room for up to 76 standees, leading to criticism the new buses were "cattle trucks" and even more crowded than the buses they replaced.

After a public consultation in June 2022, it was announced that in 2023, both routes 507 and 521 would be withdrawn and replaced with portions of routes 11, 59 and 133, leading to the end of short-distance commuter buses in central London.

See also
Buses in London
Articulated buses in London

References

www.countrybus.org AEC Merlin page
www.countrybus.org Leyland National II page
www.countrybus.org Leyland National Greenway page

External links

Bus transport in London